This is a list of Hindu temples in Singapore. A characteristic of most temples is the presence of murtis (or statues) of the Hindu deity to whom the temple is dedicated. They are usually dedicated to a single presiding deity, and other deities associated with the main deity. Exceptionally, some temples are dedicated to several deities, and others are dedicated to murtis in an aniconic form.

The following temple list is classified according to the main deity of the temple

Ganesha / Vinayagar temples
Sri Layan Sithi Vinayagar Temple, 78 Keong Siak Road, Singapore 089167
Sri Senpaga Vinayagar Temple, 19 Ceylon Road, Singapore 429613
Loyang Tua Pek Kong Vinayagar Temple, 20, Loyang Way, Singapore 508774

Shiva temples
Sri Arasakesari Sivan Temple, 25 Sungei Kadut Avenue, Singapore 729679
Sri Manmatha Karuneshvarar Temple, 226 Kallang Road, Singapore 339096
Sri Siva Durga Temple (formerly Sri Sivan Temple), 8 Potong Pasir Avenue 2, Singapore 358362
Sri Siva Krishna Temple, 31 Marsiling Rise, Singapore 739127
Sri Sivan Temple, 24 Geylang East Avenue 2, Singapore 389752

Amman / Sakthi temples
Sree Maha Mariamman Temple, 251 Yishun Avenue 3, Singapore 769061
Sri Mariamman Temple, Singapore South Bridge Road (biggest and the oldest temple in Singapore)
Sri Ruthra Kaliamman Temple, 100 Depot Road, Singapore 109670
Sri Vadapathira Kaliamman Temple, 555 Serangoon Road, Singapore 218174
Sri Veerama Kaliamman Temple, 141 Serangoon Road, Singapore 218042
Vairavimada Kaliamman Temple, Toa Payoh

Murugan temples
Arulmigu Velmurugan Gnana Muneeswaran Temple, 50 Rivervale Cres Sengkang, Singapore 545029. https://web.archive.org/web/20160627125119/http://www.avgmt.sg/
Sri Arulmigu Murugan Temple, Jurong East St 21, Singapore 609605
Sri Holy Tree Balasubramaniam Temple, 10 Yishun Industrial Park A, Singapore 768772. http://www.holytreebalasubramaniar.com.sg/
Sri Murugan Hill Temple, 931 Upper Bukit Timah Rd, 678207
Sri Thendayuthapani Temple, Singapore, 15 Tank Road, Singapore 238065 http://www.sttemple.com/

Vishnu (Perumal / Rama and Krishna/Hanuman) temples
Sri Krishnan Temple, 152 Waterloo Street, Singapore 187961
Sree Ramar Temple, 51 Changi Village Road, Singapore 509908
BAPS Shri Swaminarayan Mandir, 81 Joo Chiat Road, #02-04, Singapore 427725
Sri Srinivasa Perumal Temple, 397 Serangoon Road Singapore 218123
Sri Krishna Mandir (Hare Krishna), 9 Lor 29 Geylang, #03-02, Singapore 388065

Muneeswarar temples
Sri Darma Muneeswaran Temple, 17 Serangoon North Avenue 1, Singapore 555894
Sri Muneeswarar Temple, No. 3 Commonwealth Drive, Singapore 149594
Sri Veeramuthu Muneswarar Temple, 523, Yishun Industrial Park A, Singapore 768770
Sri Muneeswarar Peetam, 16 Ubi Road 4, Singapore 408624

Other temples and Hindu organisations
Geetha Ashram
Narayana Gurukula
Siddhartha Temple
Sree Guru Raghavendra Mandir, 565 Serangoon Road, Singapore 218180
Sri Ramakrishna Mission, Bartley Road
Sri Sai Temple, Shri vadapathira kaliamman Temple, 555 Serangoon road, Singapore 218174
 BAPS Shri Swamianarayan
 MelMaruvathur Aadhiparasakthi vara valipadu mandram 414 Racecourse Road behind vadapathira kaliamman Temple

See also 

 Context 
 1915 Singapore Mutiny
 Greater India
 History of Indian influence on Southeast Asia
 History of Singaporean Indians
 Indian diaspora
 Indianisation
 Indian National Army in Singapore
 Hinduism in South East Asia
 Indian-origin religions and people in Singapore
 Arya Samaj in Singapore
 Hinduism in Singapore
 Jainism in Singapore
 Indian Singaporeans
 Lists of Hindu temples by country
 List of Indian organisations in Singapore
 Singaporean Indians

References

External links

Hare Krishna Temple

See Also:

Singapore
Hindu temples